Mary Eliza Walker Crump (1857 – August 6, 1928) was an African-American contralto singer and manager, one of the original Fisk Jubilee Singers.

Early life
Mary Eliza Walker was born in slavery near Nashville, Tennessee. "My mother belonged to Wesley Greenfield and my father to John W. Walker of Nashville," she wrote in an 1873 publication. Her father owned an icehouse after the American Civil War.

Career

Mary Elizabeth Walker was just thirteen years old when she became one of the original eleven Fisk Jubilee Singers. White missionary and music professor George L. White organized the group at the Fisk School in Nashville, Tennessee in 1871. Other original members of the group were Maggie Porter and Ella Sheppard. They toured together, in various permutations, from 1871 to 1878, including concerts in England and Germany, singing African-American spirituals. They also sang songs by white composer Stephen Foster. Their performances raised money for their school, and eventually built Jubilee Hall on the Nashville campus. Their audiences included Queen Victoria, Ulysses S. Grant, Henry Ward Beecher, Mark Twain and Dwight L. Moody.

After the original group disbanded in 1878, Eliza Walker Crump lived in Chicago, and managed the Walker Jubilee Singers, also billed as Walker's Famous Jubilee Singers, touring and performing in a similar vein.  They were also a popular act on the chautauqua circuit. In 1921, Crump attended the Fisk Jubilee Singers' fiftieth anniversary observance, as one of the four original members still living.

Personal life
Walker married fellow singer Thomas H. Crump; he died in 1922. Mary Eliza Walker Crump died in 1928, in Chicago, aged 70–71 years. Ambrose Caliver, the president of Fisk University, sent a letter to be read at her funeral, saying "Fisk University rejoices in the complete fruition of a life so full of beauty and service. The gradual closing of the ranks of the first Jubilee Singers grieves us beyond measure, but we shall always cherish the memory of those who helped to make Fisk possible."

In 1978, fifty years after she died, Eliza Walker and the other original members of the Fisk Jubilee Singers were granted posthumous honorary Doctor of Music degrees from Fisk University.

References

External links
 A promotional brochure for Walker's Jubilee Singers, from the 1910s, in the Redpath Chautauqua Collection, University of Iowa Libraries.
 Fletcher F. Moon, "So 'Fisk' ticated Ladies and Gentlemen: Highlights From 150 Years of Fisk University’s Musical Tradition, Impact, and Influence" Library Faculty and Staff Presentations and Publications (Tennessee State University 2016).

1857 births
1928 deaths
People from Nashville, Tennessee
American women singers
Fisk University alumni
19th-century American slaves
African-American women musicians
20th-century African-American people
20th-century African-American women
19th-century African-American women